The First Battle of Caribrod, was a battle of the Serbo–Bulgarian War fought on November 2, 1885 (O.S.) between the Royal Serbian Army and Bulgarian Army around Caribrod, today Dimitrovgrad, Serbia.

Background 
The Unification of Bulgaria was not accepted by all Balkan states. Greece and Serbia were main opponents to this Bulgarian move believing that this will endanger their plans for Macedonia. On November 2, 1885, King Milan I declared war on the Principality of Bulgaria and the same day, the Royal Serbian Army started an attack on the Bulgarian Army, in an attempt to quickly reach Sofia and capture Bulgaria. The King thought Bulgaria would be too busy preparing war with the Ottoman Empire, and that its Western borders would be largely undefended. Before the attack, the Danube Division of Niš Army was taking positions around Pirot and preparing the action towards Caribrod.

Battle 
The Serbian attack started on November 2, when the Royal Serbian Army launched an attack with 3–4 hours of late in for directions towards Sofia and on every direction, there was a single division. Forces ratio before the battle was 7:1 in Serbian favor.

Plan of the battle 
The Danube Division was tasked to enter Bulgarian territory, capture Caribrod, come to line Kalotina – Vishan and to take the Dragoman pass. In that way the Danube Division will be able to support the Šumadija Division on right side.

Forces of the Danube Division, commanded by general Milutin Jovanović, were divided in two columns. Division's right column was composed of 7th Serbian Infantry Regiment that attacked from Srećkovac to Željuša and continuing to Caribrod and left column was composed of 9th Infantry Regiment, which had to pass village of Činiglavci and continue to Caribrod. Cavalry Brigade, commanded by colonel Jovan Praporčetović, and 19th Guard Battalion with one artillery battery was positioned near Tepoš village and they had task to pass state border, reach villages Odorovci and attack finish on line Stanyantsi – Izvor. Drina Division, commanded by colonel Jovan Mišković, was left in reserve until the main forces passed Sukovo Bridge. Šumadija Division, commanded by colonel Stevan Binički, was in valley of Jerma river, which was also the direction of progressing towards Bulgaria. Morava Division, commanded by colonel Petar Topalović, had task to control road Pirot – Tran and take the final town on that road.

Caribrod Detachment was commanded by captain Hristo Popov. His detachment was composed of one infantry batalion, three opalchentsi companies and one cavalry squadron.

Realisation of the plan 
All Serbian divisions very soon after the start of attack made contact with Bulgarians and had great fire resistance. Morava Division was stopped about two hours by Opalchentsi detachment with 60 fighters after passing the border near Daschen pass. Later division stayed on Ruj Mountain where stayed during night because of fog without any greater success. Šumadija Division was stopped by small battalion of captain Andrei Bukureshtliev (4th Plevne Infantry Regiment) on road between Planinci and Banjski Dol. Danube Division only had approximate success to the planned one. Caribrod Detachment resisted to Danube Division near Caribrod for a bit of time and at 16:30 Serbs captured Caribrod but they couldn't continue to the planned line Kalotina–Vishan. Because of no need to make unnecessary casualties, Caribrod Detachment retreated on its positions near Dragoman. Right column stopped its attack in Lukavica village where forces stayed during the night. Cavalry Brigade awaited the 19th Infantry Regiment and an artillery battery to be sent to their positions. Cavalry Brigade launched attack on 14:00 and on night came to the Smilovci village where it was waited by bad fortified detachment of Bahchevanov (one infantry battalion, one cavalry squadron and 4 cannons). In the night that detachment together retreated to Stanyantsi village to avoid any unnecessary casualties.

The battle was concluded without any major Bulgarian casualties and also without great territorial success as the Royal Serbian Army was only able to advance 5 kilometres into Bulgarian territory.

See also 
 Serbo-Bulgarian War
 Battle of Slivnitsa
 Dimitrovgrad, Serbia

References 

Serbo-Bulgarian War
Pirot District